The following lists events that happened during 1942 in South Africa.

Incumbents
 Monarch: King George VI.
 Governor-General and High Commissioner for Southern Africa: Sir Patrick Duncan
 Prime Minister: Jan Christiaan Smuts.
 Chief Justice: Nicolaas Jacobus de Wet.

Events
 5 May – 6 November – South African 7th Motorised Brigade and South African Air Force join the allied forces in Operation Ironclad to capture Madagascar.
 29 November – Blue Star Line cargo liner MV Dunedin Star runs aground on the Skeleton Coast of South West Africa.

Births
 12 April – Jacob Zuma, African National Congress president and 3rd President of South Africa.
 22 May – Pallo Jordan, African National Congress politician and fake PhD.
 24 May – Ali Bacher, cricketer and cricket administrator.
 18 June – Thabo Mbeki, 2nd President of South Africa.
 25 June – Joe Mafela, actor (d. 2017).
 28 June – Chris Hani, leader of the South African Communist Party and chief of staff of Umkhonto we Sizwe. (d. 1893)
 30 October –Simphiwe ThankU Leader of the Love for Kawasaki and Wasabi enterprise. (d. 2022 from covid 2020)
 17 January – Muhammad Ali,   hero  Louisville, Kentucky, United States of America.

Deaths
 25 April – John Royston, soldier and farmer. (b. 1860)
 16 June – Jack Frost, Second World War fighter pilot, is reported missing in action. (b. 1918)

Railways

Sports

References

History of South Africa